Copan Dam is a dam in Washington County, Oklahoma, in the northeastern part of the state.

It impounds Little Caney River for flood control and municipal drinking water. The dam is owned and operated by the Corps of Engineers.

Copan Wildlife Area is a wildlife management area that was leased to the Kansas Department of Wildlife and Parks from the Corps of Engineers in 1981. The wildlife area is part of an overall project with the Copan Reservoir, located in Oklahoma.

References 

Dams in Oklahoma
United States Army Corps of Engineers dams
Dams completed in 1983
Buildings and structures in Washington County, Oklahoma
Earth-filled dams